First Night is Jane Olivor's debut album. It was released in 1976 via Columbia Records.

Critical reception

William Ruhlmann stated in his AllMusic review that "Olivor seemed at the start of her career to be creating a new form of light pop music that plumbed the complex emotional depths first investigated by confessional singer/songwriters, yet employed a sophistication associated with an earlier generation of singers."

Jonathan Frank of Talkin Broadway wrote, First Night was named Album of the Year by Stereo Review. Her early reviews compared her to Barbra Streisand and Edith Piaf. Coast to Coast Tickets and Corporate Artists verified this as well.

The New York Times wrote that "within the stylistic context in which [Olivor] works, First Night is a fine record."

Robert Christgau was critical of the album, writing that "her LP is marginally adventurous, but if she becomes a star it will be by embodying the half of Barbra Streisand that Bette Midler put in the garbage."

Track listing

All track information and credits were taken from the CD liner notes.

Charts

References

External links
Columbia Records Official Site

1976 debut albums
Jane Olivor albums
Columbia Records albums